The European Fellowship of Christian Youth (EF) is an umbrella organization for Christian youth organizations from across Europe.

Member organizations

Full members

Associate members

Organizations in touch

References

International organizations based in Europe
Youth organizations based in Europe
International organisations based in Belgium
Christian youth organizations